The Lavaux Ladies Open is a women's professional golf tournament in the LET Access Series, held since 2018 in Lavaux, the canton of Vaud, Switzerland.

Played at Lavaux Golf Club located a few miles from Lake Geneva between Lausanne and Montreux, the tournament is set in the landscape between Lac de Bret and Mont Pèlerin (1,080 m), with a panoramic view of the Alps.

In 2020, 16-years-old Pia Babnik produced a course-record round of 63 (−9) to take a commanding five-shot lead after the second round, but the Slovenian ultimately lost in a playoff to Agathe Laisne of France, who won with a birdie on the second playoff hole.

Winners

See also
Flumserberg Ladies Open

References

External links

LET Access Series events
Golf tournaments in Switzerland